Windy Ridge is a suburb of the North Shore of Auckland, New Zealand. It is currently under the local governance of Auckland Council. Windy Ridge had a population of 3,054 people in 1996, 3,111 people in 2001 and 3,375 people in 2006.

Education
Windy Ridge School is a coeducational contributing primary school (years 1–6), with a decile rating of 7 and a roll of 198. The school includes two satellite classes from Wilson School for students with intellectual or physical disabilities.

Notes

External links
 Windy Ridge School website

Suburbs of Auckland